Liu Haiguang (born July 11, 1963) is a former Chinese international footballer who spent the majority of his career playing for the Shanghai Team, however he gained distinction when he joined Yugoslav club FK Partizan along with Jia Xiuquan making them one of the earliest Chinese footballers to play in Europe.

Biography
Liu Haiguang started his youth career with the Shanghai Team and would soon break into the Chinese U-20 team where he took part in the 1983 FIFA World Youth Championship where he scored one goal as China were knocked-out in the group stages. He would soon become a regular for Shanghai and also be promoted to the Chinese senior team where he was included in the squad for the 1984 AFC Asian Cup, which saw China finish runners-up. After establishing himself as a regular for the national team he along with fellow international team mate Jia Xiuquan would join Yugoslav club FK Partizan and together be one of the earliest Chinese footballers to play in a European club. Liu stayed for two seasons playing in the Yugoslav First League where he won the 1988–89 Yugoslav Cup before soon returning to Shanghai.

On the international stage he represented China at the 1988 AFC Asian Cup and in the 1988 Summer Olympics. When he decided to retire from international football he had scored 36 goals for China national football team making him their top goalscorer. This record would however be broken by Hao Haidong several years later and currently Liu is the second highest goalscorer. He would retire completely from playing in 1991 and since then has become a businessman and founded 4 children football clubs.

International goals

Honours
Partizan
Yugoslav Cup: 1988–89
Shanghai Team
Chinese FA Cup: 1991

References

External links

 Sports News Article
 International stats

1963 births
Living people
Chinese footballers
Footballers from Shanghai
China international footballers
Shanghai Shenhua F.C. players
Chinese expatriate footballers
Expatriate footballers in Yugoslavia
FK Partizan players
Yugoslav First League players
Association football forwards
Footballers at the 1988 Summer Olympics
1988 AFC Asian Cup players
Olympic footballers of China
Chinese expatriate sportspeople in Yugoslavia
Footballers at the 1986 Asian Games
Footballers at the 1990 Asian Games
Asian Games competitors for China